Robert Henry "Skee" Riegel (November 25, 1914 – February 22, 2009) was an American professional golfer.

Riegel attended West Point, Hobart College, and Lafayette College where he played football and baseball but not golf. He took up golf at the age of 23.

During World War II, he was a flying instructor for the US Army Air Corp in Arkadelphia, Arkansas.

Riegel won the 1947 U.S. Amateur over Johnny Dawson at the Pebble Beach Golf Links, 2 and 1. He played on the Walker Cup teams of 1947 and 1949 under captain as Francis Ouimet. He went undefeated in his four Walker Cup matches.

Riegel was the low amateur (T13) in the 1948 Masters Tournament

Riegel turned professional in 1950 and played in 11 straight Masters Tournaments from 1947 to 1957. In the 1951 Masters Tournament, he was tied with Sam Snead after three rounds and finished second to Ben Hogan by two strokes.

Riegel finished second to Ted Kroll in the 1952 Insurance City Open.

Riegel stopped playing full-time in 1952-1953. He served as head pro at Radnor Valley Country Club from 1954 to 1961 and then became involved in the ownership of York Road Country Club in Bucks County, Pennsylvania.

Riegel was the Pro Emeritus at the Cape May National Golf Club in Cape May, New Jersey. He was often found walking the grounds with his poodle John Paul. Cape May National holds a large amount of history, with a number of articles about "Skee" on the walls of its clubhouse, as well a number of plaques located on the 18th tee.

Amateur wins
1942 Florida State Amateur
1943 Southern Oregon Amateur
1946 Trans-Mississippi Amateur
1947 Monroe Invitational, U.S. Amateur
1948 Trans-Mississippi Amateur, Western Amateur

Professional wins
this list may be incomplete
1957 Pennsylvania Open Championship
1959 Pennsylvania Open Championship, Yorktown Open
1960 Philadelphia Open Championship, Genesee (Genny) Open
1967 Salsbury Open
1968 Salsbury Open

Major championships

Amateur wins (1)

Results timeline
Amateur

Professional

Note: Riegel never played in The Open Championship.

M = medalist
LA = low amateur
NT = no tournament
CUT = missed the half-way cut (3rd round cut in 1962 PGA Championship)
"T" indicates a tie for a place
R64, R32, R16, QF, SF = round in which player lost in match play

Sources: Masters, U.S. Open and U.S. Amateur, PGA Championship, 1947 British Amateur

U.S. national team appearances
Amateur
Walker Cup: 1947 (winners), 1949 (winners)

References

External links
Biography

American male golfers
Golfers from Pennsylvania
United States Military Academy alumni
Military personnel from Pennsylvania
Hobart and William Smith Colleges alumni
Lafayette Leopards baseball players
Lafayette Leopards football players
Players of American football from Pennsylvania
People from Perry County, Pennsylvania
1914 births
2009 deaths